Norman "Norm" Wingert (born April 18, 1950) is an American former professional soccer player who played as a goalkeeper. He played in the North American Soccer League between 1973 and 1975 for the Philadelphia Atoms. His son Chris is also a professional footballer.

Wingert attended Hartwick College where he played soccer from 1969 to 1971. He then played for the Philadelphia Atoms of the North American Soccer League from 1973 to 1975. In 1976, he played for the New York Apollo of the American Soccer League.

Norm is the father of Chris Wingert who played as a defender for Real Salt Lake.

References

External links
 NASL career stats

American soccer players
American Soccer League (1933–1983) players
Hartwick Hawks men's soccer players
New York Apollo players
North American Soccer League (1968–1984) players
Philadelphia Atoms players
1950 births
Living people
Association football goalkeepers